There are 26 volumes for the manhwa, Vagrant Soldier Ares.

Volume 01 
The first volume contains nine chapters.

Volume 02 
The second volume contains nine chapters.

Volume 03 
The third volume contains six chapters.

Volume 04 
The fourth volume contains six chapters.

Volume 05 
The fifth volume contains six chapters.

Volume 06 
The sixth volume contains seven chapters.

Volume 07 
This starts with Ares and co meeting the daraak black knights.
Then we find that the leader of the black knights has red eyes and Ares believe him to be the red eyed swordsman who killed his master.
Then on the way back they are attacked and we then flip to Ares past and his meeting with Kiron
The seventh volume contains chapters 45-51.

Chapter	Summary

Volume 08 
This is the volume were we learn about Ares past and see how he lost his eye to the red eyed swordsman
we also get to meet kiron and see the battle between him and the red eyed swordsman

The eighth volume contains chapters 52-58.

Volume 09 
The ninth volume contains chapters 59-65.

Volume 10 
The tenth volume contains chapters 66-72.

Volume 11 
The eleventh volume contains chapters 73-77.

Volume 12 
The twelfth volume contains chapters 78-83 .

Volume 13 
The thirteenth volume contains chapters 84-92.

Volume 14 
The fourteenth volume contains chapters 92-102.

Volume 15 
The fifteenth volume contains chapters 103-109.

Volume 16 
The sixteenth volume contains chapters 110-117.

Volume 17 
The seventeenth volume contains chapters 118-124.

Volume 18 
The eighteenth volume contains chapters 125-135.

Volume 19 
The nineteenth volume contains chapters 136-143.

Volume 20 
The twentieth volume contains chapters 144-153.

Volume 21 
The twenty-first volume contains chapters 154-163.

Volume 22 
The twenty-second volume contains chapters 164-171.

Volume 23 
The twenty-third volume contains chapters 172-180.

Volume 24 

The twenty-fourth volume contains chapters 181-189.

Volume 25 
The twenty-fifth volume contains chapters 190-198.

Volume 26 (end)
The twenty-sixth volume contains chapters 199-207. Ares defeats the Red Eyed Swordsman and the Temple Mercenaries is restored.

References 

Lists of manhwa chapters